Flamingo Las Vegas (formerly The Fabulous Flamingo and Flamingo Hilton Las Vegas) is a casino hotel on the Las Vegas Strip in Paradise, Nevada. It is owned and operated by Caesars Entertainment.

The property includes a  casino along with 3,460 hotel rooms. The architectural theme is reminiscent of the Art Deco and Streamline Moderne style of Miami and South Beach. Staying true to its theme and name, the hotel includes a garden courtyard which serves as a wildlife habitat for flamingos. The hotel was the third resort to open on the Strip and remains the oldest resort on the Strip in operation today, and it has been since 2007 with the closure and demolition of The New Frontier. It is also the last remaining casino on the strip that opened before 1950 that is still in operation. The Flamingo has a Las Vegas Monorail station called the Flamingo & Caesars Palace station at the rear of the property. After opening in 1946, it has undergone a number of ownership changes.

History

Land background and hotel design (1945)
The Flamingo site occupies  originally owned by one of Las Vegas's first settlers, Charles "Pops" Squires. Squires paid  for the land. In 1944, Margaret Folsom bought the tract for $7,500 from Squires, and she then later sold it to Billy Wilkerson. Wilkerson was the owner of The Hollywood Reporter as well as some very popular nightclubs on the Sunset Strip: Cafe Trocadero, Ciro's and La Rue's (Hollywood).

In 1945, Wilkerson purchased  on the east side of U.S. Route 91, or about a half mile south of the Hotel Last Frontier, in preparation for his vision. Wilkerson then hired George Vernon Russell to design a hotel influenced by European style. The El Rancho Vegas and The Last Frontier were full service hotel casinos, and already open on what would become known as The Las Vegas Strip. Wilkerson also requested that the new 'Flamingo' hotel be different from the smaller "sawdust joints" on Fremont Street. He planned a hotel with luxurious rooms, a spa, a health club, a showroom, a golf course, a nightclub, an upscale restaurant and a French-style casino. Because of high wartime material costs, Wilkerson ran into financial problems almost at once, finding himself $400,000 short and hunting for new financing.

Development under Bugsy Siegel (1945)

In late 1945, mobster Bugsy Siegel and his partners came to Las Vegas. Vegas reportedly piqued Siegel and his mob's interest because of its legalized gambling and off-track betting. At the time, Siegel held a large interest in Trans America Wire, a racing publication.

Siegel began in 1941 by purchasing, with partners, shares in the El Cortez on Fremont Street for $600,000. His expansion plans were hampered by unfriendly city officials aware of his criminal background, so Siegel began looking for a site outside the city limits. Hearing that Wilkerson was seeking extra funding, Siegel and his partners posed as businessmen and directly bought a two-thirds stake in the project.

Siegel took over the final phases of construction and convinced more of his underworld associates, such as Meyer Lansky, to invest in the project. Siegel reportedly lost patience with the project's rising costs, and he once mentioned to his builder, Del Webb, that he had personally killed 16 men. Reportedly, when Webb appeared scared upon hearing that, Siegel reassured him, "Don't worry—we only kill each other."

Siegel had also built a secret ladder in the "Presidential Suite" to escape if necessary. The ladder led down to an underground garage where a chauffeured limo was always waiting.

The Flamingo Hotel & Casino opens (1946)

Siegel finally opened The Flamingo Hotel & Casino on December 26, 1946, at a total cost of $6 million. Billed as "The West's Greatest Resort Hotel", the 105-room property—and first luxury hotel on the Strip—was built  from Downtown Las Vegas. During construction, a large sign announced the hotel as a William R. Wilkerson project. The sign also read Del Webb Construction as the hotel's primary contractor and Richard R. Stadelman (who later made renovations to the El Rancho Vegas) as the building architect.

Allegedly, Siegel named the resort after his girlfriend, Virginia Hill. It was reported that Siegel called her this because of her long legs. However, this is an urban myth which is untrue. 'The Flamingo' received its name from Billy Wilkerson, the founding builder. Organized crime king, Lucky Luciano, wrote in his memoir that Siegel once owned an interest in the Hialeah Park Race Track and viewed the flamingos who populated nearby as a good omen. The "Flamingo" name is reported to have been given to the project at its inception by Wilkerson.

Post-Siegel ownerships (1947–1960)
Casino management changed the hotel name to The Fabulous Flamingo on March 1, 1947. Siegel was killed on June 20, 1947, and after his death, Moe Sedway and Gus Greenbaum, magnates of the nearby El Cortez Hotel, took possession of the hotel. Under their partnership, it became a non-exclusive facility affordable to almost anyone. They made the enterprise extremely successful. In the year 1948 alone, it turned a $4 million profit. The Fabulous Flamingo presented lavish shows and accommodations for its time, becoming well known for comfortable, air-conditioned rooms, gardens, and swimming pools. Often credited for popularizing the "complete experience" as opposed to merely gambling, its staff became known for wearing tuxedos on the job. Among the many entertainers who performed there between 1947 and 1953 were Martin and Lewis, Sammy Davis Jr., Danny Thomas, Tony Martin, Marge and Gower Champion, Polly Bergen, Lena Horne, The Mills Brothers, Alan King, Betty Hutton, Billy Eckstine, Sophie Tucker, Pearl Bailey, and Spike Jones. Rose Marie, who was one of its first entertainers under Siegel's ownership in 1946, remained loyal to the property for the rest of her life, only performing at other casinos with permission from "the boys" at the Fabulous Flamingo, according to her last words.

In 1953, the hotel's management spent $1 million in renovations and remodeling. The original entrance and signage was destroyed. A new entrance with an upswept roof was built and a pink neon sign was designed by Bill Clark of Ad-Art. A neon-bubbled "Champagne Tower" sign with pink flamingos rimming the top was also installed in front of the hotel. From 1955 to 1960, the property was operated by Albert Parvin of the Parvin-Dohrmann Corporation. Parvin owned 30% of the stock while businessman Harry Goldman owned 7.5%; other investors included singer Tony Martin and actor George Raft.

Recent years (1960–present)
In 1960, it was sold for $10.5 million to a group including Morris Lansburgh and Daniel Lifter, Miami residents with reputed ties to organized crime. Lansky allegedly served as middleman for the deal, receiving $200,000.

Kirk Kerkorian acquired the property in 1967, making it part of Kerkorian's International Leisure Company, but the Hilton Corporation bought the resort in 1972, renaming it the Flamingo Hilton in 1974. The last of the original Flamingo Hotel structure was torn down on December 14, 1993, and the hotel's garden was built on-site. The Flamingo's four hotel towers were built (or expanded) in 1977, 1980, 1983, 1986, 1990, and 1993. A 200-unit Hilton Grand Vacations timeshare tower was opened in 1993.

In 1998, Hilton's gambling properties, including the Flamingo, were spun off as Park Place Entertainment (later renamed to Caesars Entertainment). The deal included a two-year license to use the Hilton name. Park Place opted not to renew that agreement when it expired in late 2000, and the property was renamed Flamingo Las Vegas.

In 2005, Harrah's Entertainment purchased Caesars Entertainment, Inc. and the property became part of Harrah's Entertainment. The company changed its name to Caesars Entertainment Corporation in 2010.

On September 9, 2012, Port Adelaide Football Club AFL footballer John McCarthy died after falling  from a rooftop of the hotel. The incident occurred at the start of a post-season holiday for McCarthy and other Port Adelaide players. They had arrived in Las Vegas only a few hours before the incident. After reviewing evidence, police said that McCarthy had attempted to jump off the roof onto a palm tree, but fell to the ground.

The hotel underwent a $90-million makeover which was completed in 2018. The designer, Forrest Perkins, used gold and pink in the 3500 upgraded rooms and described them as contemporary retro-chic with a focus on the 70-year history of the hotel.

Facilities and attractions
The  site's architectural theme is reminiscent of the Art Deco and Streamline Moderne style of Miami and South Beach, with a garden courtyard housing a wildlife habitat featuring flamingos. It was the third resort to open on the Strip, and it is the oldest resort on the Strip still in operation today. The Flamingo has a Las Vegas Monorail station, the Flamingo/Caesars Palace station, at the rear of the property.

The garden courtyard houses a wildlife habitat featuring Chilean flamingos, Ringed Teal ducks, and other birds. There are also koi fish and turtles. It was the home of penguins, but they have since been moved to the Dallas Zoo. Extending the hotel's tropical theme, a Jimmy Buffett's Margaritaville restaurant and gift shop was opened in December 2003. An adjacent Margaritaville "minicasino" opened in October 2011.

Headlining acts perform in the Donny and Marie Showroom. The throwback venue was remodeled in 2014 that included many technological updates improving the sound systems and lighting. It seats 780 with floor seating and a balcony. It maintains the style and feel of early Vegas with red and white themed booths and chairs, red velvet curtains as well as red carpets. It provides for close intimate interactions between the performers and audience due to the clam-shell layout. It was officially named the Donny & Marie Showroom at Flamingo Las Vegas after the brother-and-sister duo that headlined for an 11-year span between 2008 and 2019. Starting late November 2019 the Donny & Marie Showroom went back to its original name Flamingo Showroom.

The theater Bugsy's Cabaret host the show "X Burlesque" which debuted in 2002. In addition the Piff the Magic Dragon show uses the same stage.

Current headliners

Paula Abdul began a residency on August 13, 2019, with her Forever Your Girl production and is currently scheduled through January 4, 2020. Alongside Paula Abdul's residency, RuPaul's Drag Race Live! also debuted in January 2020, featuring drag queens that once competed on RuPaul's Drag Race and RuPaul's Drag Race All Stars such as Aquaria, Derrick Barry, and Yvie Oddly.

Past headliners

Legendary past performers at The Flamingo include Judy Garland in 1958, Bobby Darin in 1963 (for several weeks), Fats Domino in 1963 (and for several years), Jerry Lee Lewis in 1963, and Ray Charles in 1963. The Supremes in 1966 and 1967, James Brown in 1967, Little Richard in 1967, Tom Jones in 1968 (for the album Tom Jones Live in Las Vegas), Wayne Newton (longtime Vegas resident) in 1968, and Ella Fitzgerald in 1970, and B.B. King in 1971.

Later headliners included Kenny Rogers in 1997, Foreigner in 2000, Vinnie Favorito in 2003, The Beach Boys in 2003, Jimmy Buffett in 2004. Sly & the Family Stone (from San Francisco) played the Flamingo in 2007, Old Dominion in 2017, Aaron Carter in 2017, Everclear in 2017, Lit and Alien Ant Farm (both from L.A.) in 2017, Richard Marx in 2017, Smash Mouth (from San Jose) in 2017, Rita Ora in 2018, and Gin Blossoms (from Phoenix) in 2018.

Long running shows included Gladys Knight with her Pips who played the Flamingo in 2003. Toni Braxton's show ran from August 2006 to April 2008 and closed due to Braxton's health problems. Singer Olivia Newton-John maintained a long term residency at the Flamingo from April 2014 through December 2016.

Also from 2008 through November 2019 the headlining show at the Flamingo featured brother-sister musical duo Donny and Marie Osmond. Their show premiered in September 2008, and was extended through November 2019 for an eleven-year run. The show was rated in The Best of Las Vegas online contest. Donny and Marie Osmond were voted "Best Performers of Las Vegas" in 2012, 2013 and 2014. The final show was on November 16, 2019 and holds the record for the longest-running musical act in Vegas history with 1730 performances with more than 9 million tickets sold during the production.

In popular culture

Film
The 1964 film Viva Las Vegas and the 1960 version of Ocean's 11 were filmed at the hotel, as was a flashback sequence from the 2001 version of the latter film. In the 1960 version, the Flamingo was one of the five Las Vegas casinos robbed by characters played by Dean Martin, Frank Sinatra, Peter Lawford, Sammy Davis Jr. and others.

The 1991 film Bugsy starring Warren Beatty depicted Bugsy Siegel's involvement in the construction of the Flamingo, though many of the details were altered for dramatic effect. For instance, in the film, Siegel originates the idea of the Flamingo, instead of buying ownership from Billy Wilkerson, and is killed after the first opening on December 26, 1946, rather than the second opening of the Flamingo in 1947.

Television
The Netflix original series Lilyhammer featuring E-Street Band guitarist and singer Steven Van Zandt features a nightclub in Lillehammer, Norway, named the Flamingo. During its construction, Van Zandt's character, Giovanni Henriksen (aka Frank "The Fixer" Tagliano), referenced the hotel and casino, as well as Benjamin Siegel, as his inspiration for the nightclub.

In the television series Vega$ (1978–1981), starring Robert Urich, and filmed entirely in Las Vegas, the Flamingo Hilton is featured prominently in the opening montage.

Literature
Hunter S. Thompson and Oscar Zeta Acosta stayed at the Flamingo while attending a seminar by the National Conference of District Attorneys on Narcotics and Dangerous Drugs held at the Dunes Hotel across the street. Several of their experiences in their room are depicted in Thompson's Fear and Loathing in Las Vegas: A Savage Journey to the Heart of the American Dream.

The Flamingo figures prominently in the Tim Powers novel Last Call. In the novel, the Flamingo is supposedly founded on Siegel's mythical/mystical paranoia of being pursued and killed for his archetypal position as the "King of the West", known mythologically as "Fisher King". Supposedly the Flamingo itself was meant to be a real-life personification of "The Tower" card of the tarot deck.

See also

 List of casinos in Nevada
 List of hotels in the United States
 The Don CeSar

References

External links

 

1946 establishments in Nevada
Buildings and structures completed in 1946
Caesars Entertainment
Casino hotels
Casinos in the Las Vegas Valley
Hotels established in 1946
Las Vegas Strip
Resorts in the Las Vegas Valley
Skyscraper hotels in Paradise, Nevada
Streamline Moderne architecture in Nevada